My Moment may refer to:

Music
My Moment (album), by Tee Grizzley, 2017
My Moment (EP), by Ha Sung-woon, 2019
"My Moment" (DJ Drama song), 2012
"My Moment" (Rebecca Black song), 2011
"My Moment", a song by Moses Stone, 2012
"My Moment", a song by Zee Kay (Zach Knight), 2008

Television
"My Moment", an episode of Infinite Ryvius
Trey Songz: My Moment, a 2010 documentary about Trey Songz

See also
Meu Momento (English: My Moment), an album by Wanessa, 2009